Mehdi Karimian (born August 28, 1980) is a retired  Iranian footballer who last played for Fajr Sepasi in the Iran Pro League.

Club career
Karimian joined Sepahan in 2009 after spending the previous three seasons at Bargh Shiraz.

Club career statistics

 Assist Goals

Personal
Karimian is the brother of Moghavemat Sepasi midfielder Mehrdad Karimian.

Honours

Club
Sepahan
Iran Pro League (3): 2009–10, 2010–11, 2011–12

Tractor
Hazfi Cup (1): 2013–14

References

1980 births
Living people
Sepahan S.C. footballers
Zob Ahan Esfahan F.C. players
Bargh Shiraz players
Tractor S.C. players
Esteghlal F.C. players
Persian Gulf Pro League players
Iranian footballers
Association football midfielders
People from Bushehr